Miriam Martínez Rico (born 19 September 1990) is a Spanish Paralympic athlete. She won the silver medal in the women's shot put F36 event at the 2020 Summer Paralympics held in Tokyo, Japan.

References

Living people
1990 births
Spanish female shot putters
Paralympic athletes of Spain
Athletes (track and field) at the 2020 Summer Paralympics
Medalists at the 2020 Summer Paralympics
Paralympic silver medalists for Spain
Paralympic medalists in athletics (track and field)
Medalists at the World Para Athletics European Championships
People from Alcoià
Sportspeople from the Province of Alicante
20th-century Spanish women
21st-century Spanish women